Nearest neighbor may refer to:
 Nearest neighbor search in pattern recognition and in computational geometry
 Nearest-neighbor interpolation for interpolating data
 Nearest neighbor graph in geometry
 Nearest neighbor function in probability theory
 Nearest neighbor decoding in coding theory
 The k-nearest neighbor algorithm in machine learning, an application of generalized forms of nearest neighbor search and interpolation
 The nearest neighbour algorithm for approximately solving the travelling salesman problem
 The nearest neighbor method for determining the thermodynamics of nucleic acids
 The nearest neighbor method for calculating distances between clusters in hierarchical clustering.

See also 
 Moore neighborhood
 Von Neumann neighborhood